The Orchestre Philharmonique Royal de Liège (OPRL) (Liège Royal Philharmonique in English) is a Belgian symphony orchestra, based in Liège.  The primary concert venue and administrative base of the OPRL is the Salle Philharmonique de Liège.  The OPRL receives financial support from the Fédération Wallonie-Bruxelles, the City of Liège, the Province of Liège, the Région wallonne (Wallonie Region), and the Loterie Nationale (National Lottery).

History
Founded in 1960, the Orchestre Philharmonique Royal de Liège (OPRL) is French-speaking Belgium’s only professional symphony orchestra.

Supported by the Fédération Wallonie-Bruxelles (Belgium’s French-speaking Community), the City of Liège and Liège Province, the OPRL performs in Liège – in the prestigious setting of the Salle Philharmonique (inaugurated in 1887). The OPRL also performs throughout Belgium, as well as in great concert halls and at major festivals around Europe and in Japan and the United States. OPRL engagements in 2021 include a residency at the Malta International Music Festival.

Moulded by its founder, Fernand Quinet, and by its Music Directors (Manuel Rosenthal, Paul Strauss, Pierre Bartholomée, Louis Langrée, Pascal Rophé, François-Xavier Roth, and Christian Arming), the OPRL has developed a sound identity at the crossroads of the Germanic and French traditions. This course has continued under Gergely Madaras since September 2019. The OPRL combines a determination to support new work and to promote the Franco-Belgian heritage, while also exploring new repertoire, with a recording policy that has resulted in more than 100 recordings.

Recent additions to its discography include recordings of Respighi’s complete symphonic works (BIS) and works by Saint-Saëns (BIS), Bloch and Elgar (La Dolce Volta), Ysaÿe (Alpha), Franck (Fuga Libera, Musique en Wallonie), and Gabriel Dupont (Fuga Libera), as well as Contemporary Clarinet Concertos with Jean-Luc Votano (Fuga Libera), Heroes with Adrien La Marca (La Dolce Volta), and Amanda Favier (NoMadMusic).

For twenty years now, the OPRL has taken up the challenge of presenting the greatest music to the widest possible audience through original projects such as the “Music Factory”, “Les samedis en famille”, “Happy Hour!”, and “OPRL+” and specific series such as “Musiques anciennes” (early music), “Musiques du monde” (world music), “Piano 5 étoiles”, and “Orgue” (organ). Since 2016, it has benefited from a partnership with the Mezzo Live HD television channel (in Europe, Asia, and Canada).

The OPRL is also very much committed to the social role it plays throughout the year, taking music to audiences with little or no experience of classical culture. It makes a particular effort to reach young people, via activities in schools, thematic concerts (including “L’Orchestre à la portée des enfants”), and especially, since 2015, through the establishment of neighbourhood orchestras with the ReMuA association (El Sistema Liège).

www.oprl.be • www.facebook.com/orchestreliege • www.twitter.com/orchestreliege • www.instagram.com/orchestrephilharoyaldeliege/ • www.youtube.com/opliege

Music directors
 Fernand Quinet (1960-1964)
 Manuel Rosenthal (1964-1967)
 Paul Strauss (1967-1977)
 Pierre Bartholomée (1977-1999)
 Louis Langrée (2001-2006)
 Pascal Rophé (2006-2009)
 François-Xavier Roth (2009-2010)
 Christian Arming (2011–2019)
 Gergely Madaras (2019–present)

Selected recordings

 Camille Saint-Sëns, Symphony in A major, Symphony n° 1 in E flat major op.2, Symphony n °2 in A minor op.55, Organ Symphony n°3 in C minor op.78, Symphony "Urbs Roma" in F, Thierry Escaich, organ, Orchestre Philharmonique Royal de Liège conducted by Jean-Jacques Kantorow. 2 SACD Bis 2021. Diapason d’or

References

External links
 Orchestre Philharmonique Royal de Liège official website

Belgian orchestras
Culture in Liège
Musical groups established in 1960
1960 establishments in Belgium